Shadow on the Sand is the fifth book in the award-winning Lone Wolf book series created by Joe Dever.  This is the final book in the "Kai" portion of the series.

Gameplay
This is the last book before the reader/player attains the rank of "Kai Master", at which point in time all acquired Kai disciplines are effectively reset in favor of new Magnakai disciplines.  Unfortunately, this means that players can be at their relative weakest here in this book if they choose to start playing a new character from scratch.

The actual gamebook is divided into two parts, each having 200 sections.  Effectively, one reads or plays through the first portion of the adventure before moving onto the second portion.  This is the first and only Lone Wolf book which exhibits this unusual split-adventure construct.

Plot
Once more, the reader (Lone Wolf) must set out on a mission bestowed upon him by the king.  This time, the mission is a diplomatic one, in which a crucial peace treaty must be signed in the far away desert empire of Vassagonia.

But as always, things are more complex than they seem, and peace is elusive. Lone Wolf walks into a trap from which he barely escapes, and he must fight the prime Darklord (Haakon) to regain a secret Kai artefact which will determine the fate of the Kai Order. This artifact is called the 'Book of the Magnakai'.

Reception

External links
Gamebooks - Lone Wolf
Gamebooks - Shadow on the Sand
Project Aon - Shadow on the Sand
Shadow on the Sand Book Review

Lone Wolf (gamebooks)
1985 fiction books
Berkley Books books